The name Lhéritier could refer to:
 Jean l'Héritier  (c. 1480 – after 1551), a French composer of the Renaissance;
 Samuel-François Lhéritier (1772–1829), a French general of the Napoleonic Wars.